Patrick William Palmer (13 April 1889 – 21 March 1971) was an Irish Fine Gael politician who served as a Teachta Dála (TD) for the Kerry South constituency from 1948 to 1961.

A national school teacher before entering politics, he was first elected to Dáil Éireann as a Fine Gael TD for the Kerry South constituency at the 1948 general election. He was re-elected at the 1951, 1954 and 1957 general elections. He retired from politics at the 1961 general election.

References

1971 deaths
Fine Gael TDs
Members of the 13th Dáil
Members of the 14th Dáil
Members of the 15th Dáil
Members of the 16th Dáil
Politicians from County Kerry
Irish schoolteachers
1889 births